Rear Admiral John Irwin (15 April 1832 – 28 July 1901) was an officer in the United States Navy. He participated in the African Slave Trade Patrol, fought in the American Civil War, and served as commander of the Asiatic and Pacific Squadrons.

Naval career
Irwin was born in Pittsburgh or Lancaster (sources vary), Pennsylvania, on 15 April 1832. He was the son of United States Congressman William W. Irwin (1803–1856) and Frances Everallyn Rose Irwin (1809–1836).  He was also the great-great step-grandson of Benjamin Franklin through his step-mother, Sophia Arabella Bache.

Early career
Irwin was appointed as a midshipman on 9 September 1847 and immediately went to sea, being attached to the frigate  in the Home Squadron from 1847 to 1848, to the frigate  in the Mediterranean Squadron from 1849 to 1850, and to the frigate  on the African Slave Trade Patrol off the west coast of Africa from 1851 to 1853. He was promoted to passed midshipman on 10 June 1853.

Assigned to the sidewheel steamer  in the Home Squadron from 1854 to 1856, Irwin was promoted to master on 16 September 1855 and then to lieutenant on the same day. His next assignment was with the United States Coast Survey from 1857 to 1858. He then served aboard the frigate  in the Home Squadron from 1859 to 1860.

American Civil War
In 1861, Irwin reported for duty aboard the screw frigate . The American Civil War broke out in April 1861, and Irwin saw a great deal of action against Confederate forces aboard Wabash. During Irwin's tour, Wabash participated in the capture of Forts Hatteras and Clark at Hatteras Inlet, North Carolina, on 29 August 1861, before becoming the flagship of the South Atlantic Blockading Squadron, one of the squadrons engaged in the Union blockade of Confederate ports. Wabash then took part in the capture of Fort Walker, Fort Beauregard, and Port Royal Sound, South Carolina, in the Battle of Port Royal on 7 November 1861. Irwin later was in command of boat howitzers Wabash placed ashore during the Battle of Port Royal Ferry, South Carolina, on 1 January 1862, and was aboard Wabash for the Battle of Fort Pulaski at Cockspur Island, Georgia, on 10–11 April 1862. He was promoted to lieutenant commander on 16 July 1862.

Leaving Wabash in 1863, Irwin performed ordnance duty at Philadelphia, Pennsylvania, in 1864, transferring later in 1864 to sea duty in the Gulf of Mexico, where he served in the Western Gulf Blockading Squadron through the end of the war in 1865.

Post-Civil War
After the Civil War, Irwin was assigned to special duty at Philadelphia from 1866 to 1867 and was promoted to commander on 25 July 1866. He then returned to sea, serving in the North Atlantic Squadron from 1868 to 1871, in command successively of the steamer  in 1868, the steamer  from 1868 to 1870, and the screw gunboat  from 1870 to 1871.

After spending 1872 on duty at League Island in Philadelphia, Irwin was commanding officer of the sailing frigate , then operating as a training ship, from 1873 to 1875. He was promoted to captain on 15 May 1875, and commanded the screw steamer , flagship of the Pacific Station, from 1875 to 1879.

Irwin then began a lengthy series of shore tours, beginning with an assignment at Mare Island Navy Yard in Vallejo, California, from 1879 to 1883, followed by special duty in 1884 and a tour as president of the Board of Inspection, California, from 1884 to 1888, during which he was promoted to commodore on 4 March 1886. He was idle, awaiting orders, from 13 December 1889 to 12 July 1890, when he assumed duties as a member of the Board of Inspection and Survey. He was promoted to rear admiral on 19 May 1891.

Departing the board in June 1891, Irwin finally returned to sea when he assumed command of the Asiatic Squadron on 7 June 1891. He arrived in Honolulu, Hawaii, suddenly and unexpectedly on 6 November 1893 to replace Commodore Joseph S. Skerrett there as commander-in-chief of the Pacific Squadron; Skerrett traded places with Irwin, taking command of the Asiatic Squadron. Irwin soon became involved in the "Black Week" crisis of December 1893 – January 1894, during which war nearly broke out between the United States and the Provisional Government of Hawaii.

Irwin was placed on the retired list on 15 April 1894 upon reaching the mandatory retirement age of 62. He hauled down his flag for the final time aboard the protected cruiser  at Honolulu the following day.

Retirement and death
In retirement, Irwin resided in Washington, D.C., where he died at his home late on the evening of 28 July 1901 after an illness of several months. He left behind his wife, a daughter, and a son, also named John Irwin, who at the time was paymaster aboard the training ship .

Gallery

See also

Notes

References

External links

John Irwin Notebook, 1854 (approximate) MS 487 held by Special Collections & Archives, Nimitz Library at the United States Naval Academy

 

1832 births
1901 deaths
Military personnel from Pittsburgh
People from Lancaster, Pennsylvania
United States Navy admirals
United States Naval Academy alumni
Union Navy officers
People of Pennsylvania in the American Civil War
Burials at Arlington National Cemetery